The Muotkatunturi Wilderness Area (Muotkatunturin erämaa-alue) is a wilderness reserve in the municipalities Utsjoki and Inari in Lapland, Finland, established in 1991. Muotkatunturi is a reindeer management area, and forestry is also practiced there. The area is maintained by the Metsähallitus.

No public roads lead into the area, there are no marked paths for travelers, and the area only has four wilderness huts. Therefore it is virtually completely natural and primitive. In the north-eastern corner there are vast swamps, in the north and west fell ridges and river valleys splitting them, and in the south-west there's pine forest. The Peltojärvi lake is in the middle of the wilderness. The highest tunturi peak is Kuárvikozzâ, .

In the south, the area is bordered by the Inari-Angeli road, in the west by Angeli-Karigasniemi road, in the north by Kaamanen-Karigasniemi road and in the east by Valtatie 4.

See also
Wilderness areas of Finland

References

This article is based on a translation of an article in the Finnish Wikipedia.

External links
 
 

Protected areas established in 1991
1991 establishments in Finland
Wilderness areas of Finland